The Satellite class was a class of 12-gun composite sloops built for the Royal Navy between 1883 and 1888, and reclassified as corvettes in 1884.

Construction

Design

Designed by Nathaniel Barnaby, the Royal Navy Director of Naval Construction, the hull was of composite construction; that is, iron keel, frames, stem and stern posts with wooden planking.  This class of composite sloops was unique in having an internal steel deck over the machinery and magazines for protection.  The Satellite class were reclassified as corvettes in 1884, and no more composite or wooden corvettes were built - in fact, Pylades was the last corvette built for the Royal Navy until the Second World War.

Propulsion

Propulsion was provided by a horizontal compound expansion of  driving a single screw.

Sail plan

All the ships of the class were built with a barque rig.

Armament

The class was designed with two 6-inch/100-pounder (81cwt) breech loaders and ten 5-inch/50-pounder (38cwt) breech loaders, plus a single light gun and four (or more) machine guns.  Heroine, Hyacinth and Royalist were built with eight 6-inch/100-pounder (81cwt) breech loaders in place of the 5-inch/6-inch mixture, and Satellite was converted to the same fit.

Ships

Operational lives

These ships were designed to patrol the far-flung reaches of Britain's maritime empire, and so Rapid and Royalist both went to the Australian Station, Satellite to the Pacific Station, Pylades to the North America and West Indies Station and Heroine, Caroline and Hyacinth all to the China Station.

References

 

 
Sloop classes
 
 Satellite